The British Virgin Islands national football team is the national team of the British Virgin Islands and is controlled by the British Virgin Islands Football Association.

They are members of both CONCACAF and FIFA.

History
Early football games in the British Virgin Islands were between British Royal Navy crew, and expatriates. In 1968, the British Virgin Islands team was founded by a team of Royal Engineers, and soon after, in 1973 the British Virgin Islands Football Association was founded. In 1974, it was affiliated by FIFA. The former Tottenham, Chelsea and Porto manager, Portuguese André Villas-Boas had his first job as Technical Director of the national team British Virgin Islands in 2000 and 2001.

World Cup qualification
In the qualifying rounds for the 2006 World Cup were drawn against St Lucia, and they were eliminated 10–0 on aggregate.

In the qualifying rounds for the 2010 World Cup they were paired with the Bahamas. They lost on the away goals rule after a 3–3 draw over both legs. Both matches were actually played in the Bahamas, but British Virgin Islands were designated as the home team in the second match, which ended 2–2.
Despite going out of the competition in the first qualifying round, the British Virgin Islands were the only side to enter the 2010 FIFA World Cup to remain unbeaten through qualification and the finals tournament (although New Zealand was undefeated in the finals tournament, they did lose a game in qualification.)

In the qualifying rounds for the 2014 FIFA World Cup  they were in the unusual position of being favorites to win their two-legged tie against neighbors U.S. Virgin Islands. However, after losing the first leg 2–0 and the return leg 2–1, the British Virgin Islands once again failed to advance to the next round.

The 2018 FIFA World Cup qualifying rounds saw British Virgin Islands take on Dominica with both legs taking place in Dominica, with the first leg acting as BVI's 'home ground' due to the away goal ruling. Despite taking the lead twice, the Islanders fell to a 3 –2 defeat at 'home' and drew 0 –0 away, meaning that once again first round qualification remained elusive.

Recent results and forthcoming fixtures

The following is a list of match results in the last 12 months, as well as any future matches that have been scheduled.

2022

2023

Coaching history

  Gary White (1998–1999)
  Gregory Grant (2000)
  William H. Moravek (2000–01)
  Patrick Mitchell (2002)
  Michael Tulloch (2004)
  Ben Davies (2004)
  Patrick Mitchell (2008)
  Avondale Williams (2008–2018)
  John Reilly (2018–2020)
  Dan Neville (2021)
  Chris Kiwomya (2021–)

Players

Current squad
The following players were called up for the 2022–23 CONCACAF Nations League matches against the Cayman Islands and Puerto Rico to take place in June 2022.

Caps and goals correct as of 12 June 2022, after match vs Puerto Rico

Recent call-ups

 

  = Withdrew due to injury
  = Preliminary squad
  = Training player
   = Withdrew (non-injury)
  = Retired

Player records

Players in bold are still active with British Virgin Islands.

Most appearances

Most goals

Competitive record

FIFA World Cup

CONCACAF Gold Cup

CONCACAF Nations League

Caribbean Cup

References

External links
British Virgin Islands FIFA.com
British Virgin Islands caribbeanfootballdatabase.com

 
Caribbean national association football teams